In the Japanese military, 1st Division may refer to:

Infantry
1st Division (Imperial Japanese Army)
1st Division (Japan)

Armoured
1st Tank Division (Imperial Japanese Army)

Artillery
1st Antiaircraft Artillery Division (Imperial Japanese Army)

Aviation
1st Flying Division (Imperial Japanese Army)

Guard
1st Guards Division (Imperial Japanese Army)